The 1991–92 DFB-Pokal was the 49th season of the annual German football cup competition. After the German reunification in 1990 the football association of eastern Germany, Nordostdeutscher Fußballverband, joined the German Football Association (DFB) on 21 November 1990. Football clubs from eastern Germany thus participated for the first time in the DFB-Pokal. 87 teams competed in the final tournament, which had thus to be extended to seven rounds. It began on 1 August 1991 and ended on 23 May 1992.

As in the year before both semi-finals were draws after 120 minutes. Both games therefore were decided by a penalty shootout as the German Football Association had decided not to hold replays any more. Eventually the final was decided by a penalty shootout, too. Second tier Hannover 96 defeated Borussia Mönchengladbach 4–3 on penalties after 120 goalless minutes. This remains the only time that the cup was won by a team outside the Bundesliga.

NOFV qualification
The following 31 teams participated in the NOFV (Nordost) qualification:

First round

Second round

Third round

Participating clubs
The following 88 teams qualified for the competition:

Matches

First round

Second round

Third round

Round of 16

Quarter-finals

Semi-finals

Final

References

External links
 Official site of the DFB 
 Kicker.de 

1991-92
1991–92 in German football cups